Rwanda's legal system is largely based on German and Belgian civil law systems and customary law.

 Rwanda National Police
 Rwanda Investigation Bureau

Historical secret police organizations
Service Central de Renseignements (SCR) (Central Information Service)

See also
Rwanda National Police

References and sources
References

Sources
 World Police Encyclopedia, ed. by Dilip K. Das & Michael Palmiotto published by Taylor & Francis. 2004,
 World Encyclopedia of Police Forces and Correctional Systems,second edition,  Gale., 2006
 Sullivan, Larry E. Encyclopedia of Law Enforcement. Thousand Oaks: Sage Publications, 2005.